The Newhaven Heritage Museum was a museum located in the village of Newhaven, within the City of Edinburgh, Scotland. 

The museum opened in 1993 and was established in the former fish market, close to the harbour. It detailed the history of the village, from its inception as a naval shipyard in the early 16th Century. The museum closed in September 2006 for work on the building but there are no plans for its reopening.

References

External links
 Official museum website

Local museums in Scotland
Defunct museums in Scotland
Museums disestablished in 2007
Museums in Edinburgh
1993 establishments in Scotland
Museums established in 1993